Four ships of the French Navy have borne the name Mistral after the wind mistral. An auxiliary ship has also borne the name.

French ship named Mistral 

 , an armoured 
 , an assault helicopter and command ship, lead ship of her class.

Other ships 
 Liane (DF 50), a service boat.
 A fishing ship, Henri Cameleyre (1908) was requisitioned as a minesweeper during the Second World War. She was restituted in 1941 and renamed Mistral.
 An auxiliary patrol boat of the Second World War also bore the name of Mistral II.

References

Bibliography 
 

French Navy ship names